Procecidochares utilis is a species of tephritid or fruit flies in the genus Procecidochares of the family Tephritidae.

Distribution
Mexico. Introduced Australia, New Zealand, Hawaii, South Africa, India, China.

References

Tephritinae
Insects described in 1947
Diptera of North America
Procecidochares